"Knock on Wood" is a 1966 hit song written by Eddie Floyd and Steve Cropper and originally performed by Floyd. The song has become covered by later artists, most notably Amii Stewart in 1979. Stewart's disco version was the most successful on weekly music charts.

Eddie Floyd version
His recording peaked at number 28 on the Billboard Hot 100 and spent one week at number 1 on the Soul Singles chart. The song was written in the Lorraine Motel in Memphis, Tennessee (now The National Civil Rights Museum). Steve Cropper has stated in interviews that there was a lightning storm the night that he and Eddie wrote the song, hence the lyrics 'It's like thunder, lightning, The way you love me is frightening'. Floyd's version earned a Gold certification from the Recording Industry Association of America (RIAA) on July 17, 1995.

Otis Redding and Carla Thomas version

David Bowie version

David Bowie released a live performance of the song as a single in the UK in 1974; the recording was taken from Bowie's live album David Live. The B-side, "Panic in Detroit", was not on that album but was from the same concert. It was added to the 2005 release of the album.
 "Knock on Wood" (Eddie Floyd, Steve Cropper) – 3:03
 "Panic in Detroit" (Bowie) – 5:52

Amii Stewart version
 
American disco and soul singer Amii Stewart released a disco version of "Knock on Wood" in 1979. It reached number one on the US charts in April 1979; it also made it to the soul singles and disco charts, becoming the best-known version of the song. This recording was co-produced  by Simon May. It reached the top 10 twice in the UK, first in 1979 (peaking at number 6) and again in a remixed version in 1985 (peaking at number 7). The song earned a gold certification on March 22, 1979, and then a platinum certification on August 1 the same year from the RIAA when the single sold one or two million units. It would become one of the "anthems for the gay community". Stewart's rendition of the song earned her a Grammy Award nomination for Best Female R&B Vocal Performance at the 22nd Annual Grammy Awards in 1980. It was featured prominently in the video game The Warriors, as well as the trailer for Walt Disney Pictures 1997 live-action film Mr. Magoo, starring Leslie Nielsen.

Charts

Weekly charts

Year-end charts

Other notable cover versions
Wilson Pickett, like Floyd a former member of the band The Falcons, covered the song on his 1967 album The Wicked Pickett. 

The American Breed also covered it on their 1967 self-titled debut album  

Buddy Guy, on his live 1968 album This Is Buddy Guy! 

The Mauds, on their 1968 album Hold On. 

James Cotton also recorded the song on his 1967 album The James Cotton Blues Band; his version is later included in the 1995 compilation album The Best of the Verve Years.

In 1971, a Filipino singer Victor Wood released his version of this song.

Razzy Bailey's version (1984) peaked at number 29 on the Billboard Hot Country Songs chart on the week of September 29, 1984, the version's ninth week. 

Eric Clapton covered the song for his 1985 album Behind the Sun. 

Actress Kathleen Wilhoite and Jeff Healy performed the song in the 1989 film Road House. 

Michael Bolton covered it for his 1992 album Timeless: The Classics. 

A singer Mary Griffin recorded her disco/dance version for the 1998 film 54; Griffin's recording was released that same year as a promotional single. 

Actress Emma Stone performed the song in the 2010 movie, Easy A.

In 1993 Beatrice Magnanensi and Letizia Mezzanotte interpret the song in the compilation Non è la Rai 2.

In 1996 Fausto Leali recorded the Italian version entitled No, non tu (No, not you), for the album Non solo blues (Not just Blues) (RTI Music, RTI 1112-4).

References

External links
 
 

1966 songs
1966 singles
1967 singles
1974 singles
1978 singles
1979 singles
Amii Stewart songs
James & Bobby Purify songs
Charles Wright & the Watts 103rd Street Rhythm Band songs
David Bowie songs
Eddie Floyd songs
Otis Redding songs
Rachel Stevens songs
Razzy Bailey songs
Guy Sebastian songs
Eric Clapton songs
Michael Bolton songs
Songs written by Steve Cropper
Songs written by Eddie Floyd
Stax Records singles
Ariola Records singles
Hansa Records singles
Billboard Hot 100 number-one singles
Cashbox number-one singles
RPM Top Singles number-one singles
Male–female vocal duets